Caspase-7, apoptosis-related cysteine peptidase, also known as CASP7, is a human protein encoded by the CASP7 gene.
CASP7 orthologs have been identified in nearly all mammals for which complete genome data are available. Unique orthologs are also present in birds, lizards, lissamphibians, and teleosts.

Function 

Caspase-7 is a member of the caspase (cysteine aspartate protease) family of proteins, and has been shown to be an executioner protein of apoptosis.  Sequential activation of caspases plays a central role in the execution-phase of cell apoptosis. Caspases exist as inactive proenzymes that undergo proteolytic processing by upstream caspases (caspase-8, -9) at conserved aspartic residues to produce two subunits, large and small, that dimerize to form the active enzyme in the form of a heterotetramer. The precursor of this caspase is cleaved by caspase 3, caspase 10, and caspase 9. It is activated upon cell death stimuli and induces apoptosis. Alternative splicing results in four transcript variants, encoding three distinct isoforms.

Interactions 

Caspase 7 has been shown to interact with:
 Caspase 8, 
 Survivin  and
 XIAP.

See also 
 The Proteolysis Map
 Caspase

References

Further reading

External links 
 The MEROPS online database for peptidases and their inhibitors: C14.004
 

EC 3.4.22
Caspases